The 1995 UEFA Cup Winners' Cup Final was a football match on 10 May 1995 contested between cup holders Arsenal of England and Zaragoza of Spain. The final was held at Parc des Princes in Paris. It was the final match of the 1994–95 UEFA Cup Winners' Cup, 35th UEFA Cup Winners' Cup final, and the first since the tournament changed name from the European Cup Winners' Cup. Zaragoza won the match 2–1 after extra time, preventing Arsenal from retaining the trophy that they had won in 1994.

The first half was goalless. In the second half, Zaragoza's Juan Esnáider opened the scoring, before John Hartson scored Arsenal's equaliser. The game went into extra time and looked to be heading to a penalty shoot-out. However, with seconds remaining, former Tottenham midfielder, Nayim, scored a last-minute goal with a 40-yard lob over Arsenal goalkeeper, David Seaman, securing the win for Zaragoza.

Route to the final

Match

Details

Statistics

See also
1994–95 UEFA Cup Winners' Cup
1995 UEFA Champions League Final
1995 UEFA Cup Final
1995 UEFA Super Cup
Arsenal F.C. in European football

References

External links
1995 UEFA Cup Winners' Cup Final at Rec.Sport.Soccer Statistics Foundation

1995
3
Cup Winners' Cup Final
Cup Winners' Cup Final
Cup Winners' Cup Final 1995
Cup Winners' Cup Final 1995
Cup Winners' Cup Final 1995
May 1995 sports events in Europe
1995 in Paris